Dolné Dubové is a village and municipality of Trnava District in the Trnava region of Slovakia.

See also
 List of municipalities and towns in Slovakia

Famous people 
 Anton Mihálik (*1907 – † 1982), SDB,  Roman Catholic priest end religious prisoner (sentenced to 6 years in prison).

References

Genealogical resources

The records for genealogical research are available at the state archive "Statny Archiv in Bratislava, Slovakia"

 Roman Catholic church records (births/marriages/deaths): 1843-1897 (parish A)

External links
http://www.dolnedubove.sk
Surnames of living people in Dolne Dubove

Villages and municipalities in Trnava District